The Monument to Captain John Francis Egerton stands in the grounds of the Oulton Estate, Little Budworth, Cheshire, England.  John Francis Egerton died in 1846 as the result of injuries sustained in the First Anglo-Sikh War.  The memorial was designed by Scott and Moffatt, and is recorded in the National Heritage List for England as a designated Grade II* listed building.

History

John Francis Egerton (1810–1846) was a younger brother of Sir Philip Grey Egerton, 10th Baronet, owner of the Oulton Estate in Cheshire.  He was serving as a Captain in the Bengal Artillery in the First Anglo-Sikh War when he fought in the Battle of Ferozeshah on 21–22 December 1845.  After severe fighting, the Sikhs were defeated.  When Egerton was reconnoitring on the site of the battle he was injured by two Sikhs who were hiding in the village.  He died from his wounds on 23 January 1846 and was buried at Ferozepore.

There was a meeting of the subscribers to the Egerton Memorial in May 1846.  They had received a letter from Sir Philip suggesting that the memorial could take the form of stained glass in Malpas church, or a monument in the grounds of the Oulton Estate.  The meeting chose the latter option, and appointed a committee to arrange it.  They appointed the architects Scott and Moffatt to design the memorial.  Its sculptor is unknown.

Description

The monument is in Gothic style, and is in the form of an Eleanor cross. The cross stands on five square steps, and consists of a square base in two stages, an octagonal turret, and an octagonal spire surmounted by a cross. The lower stage of the base is relatively plain and has diagonal buttresses. On the south face is decoration in diapering above which is a panel carved in relief. The carving is badly weathered and its subject appears to depict a house and classical figures. On the sides of the memorial are blank panels, and on the north face is an inscribed bronze plaque. The upper stage of the base is narrower, and also has diagonal buttresses; these have canopied niches containing statues of female figures in medieval dress. Above the niches the buttresses rise to crocketed pinnacles with gargoyles. The faces between them contain tracery and above are crocketed gables. The octagonal turret is decorated with blank tracery, and at its top is a cornice with gables. The turret is surmounted by the spire.

The bronze plaque on the north face contains an inscription reading as follows.

Appraisal

The monument was designated as a Grade II* listed building on 12 March 1986.  Grade II* is the middle of the three grades of listing designated by English Heritage, and is granted to "particularly important buildings of more than special interest".  The citation in the National Heritage List for England comments that this is "one of the more elaborate of the series of Victorian monuments inspired by the Eleanor Crosses".

See also

Grade II* listed buildings in Cheshire West and Chester
Listed buildings in Little Budworth

Notes and references
Notes

Citations

Sources

 
 

Grade II* listed buildings in Cheshire
Buildings and structures completed in 1847
Gothic Revival architecture in Cheshire
Monuments and memorials in Cheshire
1847 establishments in England